Events from the year 1950 in Canada.

Incumbents

Crown 
 Monarch – George VI

Federal government 
 Governor General – the Viscount Alexander of Tunis
 Prime Minister – Louis St. Laurent
 Chief Justice – Thibaudeau Rinfret (Quebec) 
 Parliament – 21st

Provincial governments

Lieutenant governors 
Lieutenant Governor of Alberta – John C. Bowen (until February 1) then John J. Bowlen   
Lieutenant Governor of British Columbia – Charles Arthur Banks (until October 1) then Clarence Wallace 
Lieutenant Governor of Manitoba – Roland Fairbairn McWilliams  
Lieutenant Governor of New Brunswick – David Laurence MacLaren 
Lieutenant Governor of Newfoundland – Leonard Outerbridge 
Lieutenant Governor of Nova Scotia – John Alexander Douglas McCurdy 
Lieutenant Governor of Ontario – Ray Lawson 
Lieutenant Governor of Prince Edward Island – Joseph Alphonsus Bernard (until October 4) then Thomas William Lemuel Prowse 
Lieutenant Governor of Quebec – Eugène Fiset (until October 3) then Gaspard Fauteux
Lieutenant Governor of Saskatchewan – John Michael Uhrich

Premiers 
Premier of Alberta – Ernest Manning   
Premier of British Columbia – Byron Johnson  
Premier of Manitoba – Douglas Campbell 
Premier of New Brunswick – John McNair 
Premier of Newfoundland – Joey Smallwood 
Premier of Nova Scotia – Angus Macdonald 
Premier of Ontario – Leslie Frost 
Premier of Prince Edward Island – J. Walter Jones  
Premier of Quebec – Maurice Duplessis 
Premier of Saskatchewan – Tommy Douglas

Territorial governments

Commissioners 
 Commissioner of Yukon – John Edward Gibben (until August 15) then Andrew Harold Gibson
 Commissioner of Northwest Territories – Hugh Llewellyn Keenleyside (until November 14) then Hugh Andrew Young

Events
January 14 - The first non-stop trans-Canada flight is made
February 14 - Nancy Hodges of British Columbia becomes the first woman in the Commonwealth elected speaker of a legislature in Canadian history.
Early May - The Winnipeg Flood along the Red River causes immense damage and one death in Winnipeg
May 29 - The St. Roch becomes the first vessel to circumnavigate North America
August 7 - Canada joins a United Nations force to fight in Korean War
August 22 – August 30 - Rail workers strike shuts down much of the Canadian economy
October 31 - The oil pipeline linking Edmonton to Sarnia is completed
November 28 - Canada joins onto the Colombo Plan
December 18 - Korean War: First Canadian troops arrive in Korea.

Full date unknown
Cité libre magazine is first published
British Columbia Provincial Police are disestablished.

Arts and literature

Awards
See 1950 Governor General's Awards for a complete list of winners and nominees for those awards. 
Stephen Leacock Award: Earle Birney, Turvey

Sport 
April 23 - The Detroit Red Wings win their fourth Stanley Cup by defeating the New York Rangers 4 games to 3. Due to scheduling conflicts at Madison Square Garden, all of the Rangers' home games were played at Maple Leaf Gardens in Toronto
May 6 - The Quebec Junior Hockey League's Montreal Junior Canadiens win their first Memorial Cup by defeating the Saskatchewan Junior Hockey League's Regina Pats 4 games to 1. All games were held at Montreal Forum.
November 25 - The Toronto Argonauts win their ninth Grey Cup by defeating the Winnipeg Blue Bombers 13–0 in the 38th Grey Cup played at Varsity Stadium in Toronto

Births

January to March

January 5
 Tom Benner, sculptor (d. 2022)
 John Manley, lawyer, businessman and politician, Deputy Prime Minister
January 13 - Joe Fontana, politician
January 17 - Jean Poirier, politician

January 18 - Gilles Villeneuve, motor racing driver (d. 1982)
February 8 - Keith Milligan, politician
February 9 - Tom Wappel, politician
February 12 - Michael Ironside, actor, voice actor, producer, film director and screenwriter
March 6 - Bruce Simpson, pole vaulter
March 17 - Jackson Davies, actor
March 23 - Jerry Storie, politician
March 23 - Ralph Eichler, politician
March 26 - Martin Short, comedian, actor, writer, singer and producer

April to June
April 1 - Daniel Paillé, leader of the Bloc Québécois 
April 16 - Robert Dutil, Canadian businessman and politician
April 19 - Gérard Asselin, politician and MP for Charlevoix and Manicouagan (1993-2011) (d. 2013)
May 2 - Jose Kusugak, Inuit politician (d. 2011)
May 10 – Dale Wilson, voice actor
May 12 - Louise Portal, actress, singer, and director
May 27 - Brent St. Denis, politician
June 1 - Perrin Beatty, corporate executive and politician
June 7 - John Wood, Olympic canoeist (d. 2013)
June 12 - David Onley, broadcaster and Lieutenant Governor of Ontario (d. 2023)
June 19 - Rosie Shuster, comedy writer and actress
June 21 - Anne Carson, poet, essayist, translator and professor of Classics and comparative literature

July to September

July 2 - Lee Maracle, writer and academic (d. 2021)
July 5 - Deepak Obhrai, politician (d. 2019)
July 6 - Hélène Scherrer, politician and Minister
July 7 - Leon Benoit, politician
July 18 - Jack Layton, politician, leader of New Democratic Party of Canada (2003-2011) and Leader of the Official Opposition (2011) (d. 2011)
July 20 - Lucille Lemay, archer
August 2 - Sue Rodriguez, advocate for assisted suicide (d. 1994)
August 6 - Carole Pope, rock singer-songwriter
August 15 - Ron Lemieux, ice hockey player and politician
August 16 - Stockwell Day, politician
August 31 - Anne McLellan, academic, politician, Minister and Deputy Prime Minister of Canada
September 8 - Richard Henry Bain, criminal who is charged with the September 4, 2012, Montreal, Quebec, shooting that killed Denis Blanchette.
September 9 - Janis Babson (d. 1961)
September 16 - Sheila Fraser, Auditor General of Canada
September 18 - Darryl Sittler, ice hockey player

October to December

October 17 – Val Ross, writer and journalist (d. 2008)
October 31 - John Candy, comedian and actor (d. 1994)
November 2 - Wendy Lill, playwright and politician
November 2 - Daryl Reid, politician
November 5 - Susan Nattrass, sport shooter
November 8 - Dennis Fentie, politician and 7th Premier of the Yukon
November 14 - Colleen Peterson, singer (d. 1996)
December 18 - Martha Johnson, pop singer and songwriter
December 20 - Carolyn Bennett, politician
December 21 - Lap-Chee Tsui, geneticist

Full date unknown
David Barr, Commander of the Canadian Special Operations Forces Command
Denis Simpson, singer and actor (d. 2010)

Deaths

January to June
February 7 - Thomas Langton Church, politician and Mayor of Toronto (b. 1870)
April 7 - Walter Huston, actor (b. 1884)

May 15 - Hervé-Edgar Brunelle, politician and lawyer (b. 1891)
June 28 - James Allison Glen, politician, Minister and Speaker of the House of Commons of Canada (b. 1877)

July to December
July 22 - William Lyon Mackenzie King, lawyer, economist, university professor, civil servant, journalist, politician and 10th Prime Minister of Canada (b. 1874)
July 25 - Gleason Belzile, politician (b. 1898)
August 1 - Humphrey Mitchell, politician and trade unionist (b. 1894)
August 2 - Pierre-François Casgrain, politician and Speaker of the House of Commons of Canada (b. 1886)
October 19 - Charles Ballantyne, politician, Leader of the Opposition in the Senate (b. 1867)
November 11 - John Knox Blair, politician, physician and teacher (b. 1873)

Full date unknown
William Sanford Evans, politician (b. 1869)

See also
 List of Canadian films

Historical documents
North Korea invades South and Opposition Leader says Canada is involved through UN role and because of immediacy of modern world

Moral, not strategic, stakes require defeat of North Korea, so that "naked aggression" will not destroy state created by UN

Film: newsreel of Canadian airmen leaving for Korea as U.S. troops fight on defensive near Pusan invasion beachhead

Canada and U.S.A. agree to further defence industry mobilization at level of cooperation seen in Second World War

"It is the function of diplomacy to seek accommodation" - Canada and allies send in diplomats as well as military to end Korean War

Canadian troops arrive by ship at Pusan, Korea and U.S. Army band plays "If I Knew You Were Coming I'd Have Baked a Cake"

"Uneasy equilibrium" - In countering Chinese attack in Korean War, Canada and allies must not provoke U.S.S.R. to start world war

"Growing atmosphere of fear, suspicion, frustration, and isolation" - Authorities in Eastern Bloc countries harass diplomats

"Our first duty to civilization is[...]sufficient military strength" - Prime Minister St. Laurent on liberalism against totalitarianism

For federal-provincial accord on bill of rights, Senate committee says "control within Canada of the Canadian Constitution" is required

Though "coloured troops introduced venereal disease[...]during the war," Canada can hardly refuse Black GIs since U.S. military integration

Pakistani PM says idea that "commonwealth ties are mainly religious, historical or racial must be regarded as having outlived its use"

"There is discrimination against Indians in the matter of immigration[...]and admission of relatives of Indians already settled"

With Canada's "serious shortage of female domestics and nurses' aids," loans should go to Europeans in "this class of immigrant"

"We can ASK...CRUSADE...DEMAND...and WIN" - Alton C. Parker and other Windsor, Ont. Blacks organize to oppose segregation

Photo: Emily General from Six Nations of the Grand River shows Haldimand Treaty to members of UN Commission on Human Rights

"Vast volume of water into every stream" - Signs of major flood event noted before Red River flood surge enters Manitoba

Film: newsreel of Winnipeg flood extent and evacuations

"Small measure of our gratitude for all the help we have had" - Britons donate unique household items to flood victims

"Too willing to accept people at their face value" - RCMP security report on Canadian diplomat Herbert Norman

Film: 30-minute short on cancer research and treatment includes laboratory, hospital and classroom shots, plus animation

Film: newsreel of parachute personnel jumping from Dakota aircraft on practice rescue mission out of RCAF Station Trenton

References

 
Years of the 20th century in Canada
Canada
1950 in North America